Kuwar Virk (born 21 October 1990) is an Indian music director, singer, rapper, and songwriter from Delhi, India. He made his debut as a rap artist in the year 2010 as D-Rap Blaster. His first commercial track was Nakhra featuring Mika Singh, Kaptan Laddi which was released in 2014. He made a major entry in Bollywood as a singer with song "Malamaal" from movie Housefull 3.

Early life 

Kuwar Virk is a Delhi-based artist. He learnt the art of music production in the year 2012 and 2013. Kuwar did his schooling from Guru Harkrishan Public School, Fateh Nagar, Delhi.

Career 
Kuwar started his career in 2010 as Hip-Hop Rap artist. He was founder member of group D-Rap Blaster. His first track was Nakhra featuring Mika Singh, Kaptan Laadi. This song was released in 2014 by Zee Music Company. Song promoted by Studio SOS And Raj Saini.

Bollywood 

Kuwar Virk was one of the music programmers of song "Chittian Kalaiyaan" from movie Roy for Meet Bros. Kuwar got a major hype in Bollywood with song "Malamaal" which is a part of official soundtrack of Housefull 3 starring Akshay Kumar, Jacqueline Fernandez, Riteish Deshmukh, Nargis Fakhri, Abhishek Bachchan, Lisa Haydon. He sang the song "Malamaal" along with Mika Singh, Akira, Miss Pooja.

Discography

Film soundtrack

Single tracks

Awards 

Kuwar Virk was one of the music producers for movie Shareek. This movie got Mirchi Music Award Punjabi – Film album of the year.

References

External links 
 

1991 births
Living people
People from Delhi